Events from the year 1774 in Canada.

Incumbents
Monarch: George III

Governors
Governor of the Province of Quebec: Guy Carleton
Governor of Nova Scotia: Lord William Campbell
Commodore-Governor of Newfoundland: John Byron
Governor of St. John's Island: Walter Patterson

Events

 September 4 – Delegates from twelve colonies discuss measures for common safety, at Philadelphia. Canada and Georgia are not represented, though invited. Vermont, not being organized, is not invited.
 Lord Dunmore's War fought in Virginia between settlers and Shawnees.
 The first Continental Congress meets.
 Guy Carleton's recommendations are instituted in the Quebec Act, which introduces British criminal law but retains French civil law and guarantees religious freedom for Roman Catholics. The Act's geographical claims, and toleration of Roman Catholics, were so offensive to the 13 Colonies that it helped precipitate the American War of Independence.
 Juan Perez ordered by Spain to explore west coast; discovers Prince of Wales Island, Dixon Sound.

Births
 February 4: Frederick Traugott Pursh, botanist (d.1820) 
 March 13: Rose Fortune, entrepreneur (d.1864) 
 August 19: Denis-Benjamin Viger, politician, businessman and politician (d.1861)
 September 5: Enos Collins, seaman, merchant, financier, and legislator (d.1871) 
 September 17: William Fitzwilliam Owen, naval officer, hydrographic surveyor (d.1857) 
 December 27: Brenton Halliburton, army officer, lawyer, judge, and politician (d.1860)

Deaths
 July 11: Sir William Johnson, 1st Baronet, superintendent of northern Indians (b. 1715)

Historical documents
Cover letter on British Quebeckers' petition for provincial assembly to make laws that do not risk their success or their children's Protestant education

Cramahé warns Dartmouth of British Quebeckers with "American Ideas in regard to Taxation," saying their "Irregularity" is bad example to Canadians

Quebec Act allows Catholicism and Canadian civil law and rights, establishes legislative council and expands province to include land north of Ohio River

"Can a better legislature be given than that of a governor and council?" - Lord North says Quebec assembly can't be set up as it would have to be Catholic

Former Quebec attorney general thinks temporary, Crown-appointed council with minority of Catholics better than Quebec bill's governor-appointed council

"House of riot" - Quebec chief justice thinks Canadians see no advantage in provincial assembly that would be source of disturbance and obstruction

Against Quebec Act, Chatham says it would lose "hearts of all the Americans" and British Quebeckers would deplore loss of jury trials and habeas corpus

Charles Fox for assembly, which can safely include Canadians, as Catholics have nothing "repugnant in their views to the principles of political freedom"

"The great maxim to be learned from the history of our colonization is—let men manage their own affairs" - MP opposes Quebec spread, other parts of bill

Supporter says Quebec bill adopts "a government suitable to the genius of the people" who were "tractable[,] easily governed [and] happy" under French

"I never yet knew it was found a grievance to any nation, to give them the English laws," which Canadians value, and should be worked into their civil law

"A work of time and difficulty" - Quebec chief justice describes way to mix Canadian and English laws to satisfaction of both, rather than apply former only

Londoners trading to Quebec petition to relieve Quebec merchants by retaining English law (including jury trials) and "grants and commissions" of past

Regarding juries, Gov. Carleton says Canadians think it strange that British prefer trial verdicts of "tailors and shoemakers [and] gentlemen" over judges

Edmund Burke: Quebec border (upper St. Lawrence, lower Great Lakes to Pennsylvania line, south to Ohio River) will divide liberty from French slavery

Anonymous letter circulated among "French or Canadian Inhabitants" supports Quebec Act with answers to objections made by British seeking its repeal

Advocate General says Britain can safely and rightly allow Catholic worship in Quebec, but must ban Catholic doctrine and papal or other foreign control

In Commons, Carleton says Quebec trade (two thirds in Canadian hands) has greatly increased because of "very fast" growth of population and farming

"The body of the people are not at all dissatisfied with the conquest" - Quebec chief justice thinks Canadians enjoy improved cultivation and land value

Carleton says Canadians were told British law would make them happy, but felt mocked when denied civil rights and "places of profit, or trust, or honour"

Gathered in congress, 12 American colonies see Quebec Act erecting "arbitrary government" on their frontiers and inclining its inhabitants to hostility

"These are the rights you are entitled to" - Congress urges Canadians to join it and demand rights of Englishmen to check Quebec Act's arbitrariness

Letter received from Philadelphia congress inviting Quebec merchants to support measures of "southern Colonies" is burned, and aid for Boston blocked

Carleton on Canadians' "Uneasiness" at some British Quebeckers' efforts "to throw this Province into the same Disorders that reign" in other colonies

Petitions for repeal of Quebec Act, with 187 signatures from Montreal and Quebec City, are sent to King, House of Lords and House of Commons

In case situation worsens in Massachusetts, Gen. Gage asks Carleton if and how "Canadians and Indians" could be organized for military service there

"Tuesday Morning last arrived from Boston the Sloop London Expedition, Capt. Chevalier, with 27 Acadiens, come to settle here" in Quebec

Nova Scotia governor on meetings that "greatly tend to disturb the Peace; and to promote[...]public Disorders and the highest Contempt of Government"

As exporting grain and pease "has been the Occasion of great Scarcity," bond and certificate of shipping within Nova Scotia are required through 1775

Military and "wandering" persons without passes, all who even threaten to desert family, and anyone "seriously mad and dangerous" are to be arrested

Scarborough, Yorkshire correspondent says town is full of emigrants, most of whom lack "good fortune[...]and expect to find it in the wilds of Nova Scotia"

Yorkshiremen see Nova Scotia's good crop land, pasture and timber, but settlers too few and "ignorant, indolent, bad managers, and[...]poor" to prosper

Touring farmers find Annapolis Valley's poor, rum-drinking New England settlers are very bad farmers ("strangers to cultivation") missing trade prospects

Nova Scotia women "very industrious house-wives" who on Sundays dress in silk and calico with long ruffles, their hair dressed high, and carrying fans

Halifax workhouse wants adults and children "to pick Oakum or Spin" for "good Victuals & Drink, and a good warm Stove Room to Work and Lodge in"

Elizabeth Fleming, "having perfectly learn'd the art of a Midwife,[...]will readily at any moment wait on Rich or Poor"

Grammar school opened in Halifax to teach Greek, Latin and French, and writing, cyphering and bookkeeping, with hours from 6 to 8, 10 to 12 and 3 to 5

Evening school classes in writing, arithmatic and bookkeeping available to "young Gentlemen Apprentices and others" in Halifax

Halifax woman teaches reading and writing, sewing and knitting, and flowering, marking and mitts knitting in her school, plus she makes hats and dresses

Three-act comedy to run in Halifax that playwright says is entirely fictional, with characters "too outre to be personal on any Persons here or elsewhere"

British frigate orders French frigate off "the fishing banks at Newfoundland," but it refuses and in battle loses its masts and has to strike its colours

George Cartwright gives "a severe beating" to employee lost in woods near his Labrador home, and teaches him "unerring rules" about finding his way

"Collector of North-American Plants" is in Labrador "to make Discoveries in that uncultivated and barren Part of the World, where no Botanist ever was"

"An Act to discontinue[...]landing[...]or shipping of Goods, Wares, and Merchandise at[...]Boston; Whereas dangerous Commotions and Insurrections[....]"

Brief note that 1,000 bushels of grain has arrived at Salem, Massachusetts from Quebec "for the poor at Boston"

Brief obituary for Sir William Johnson,  of Indian Affairs

Inscription on Wolfe's sarcophagus (removed?) in Westminster Abbey lauds his "surmounting by Ability, and Valour, all obstacles of Art and Nature"

References 

 
Canada
74